December Heat is a 2008 historic action drama film about the 1924 Estonian coup d'état attempt directed by Asko Kase and starring Sergo Vares and Liisi Koikson.

Plot
"December 1924. It's only a matter of minutes whether Estonian young independence continues to exist or we become a province with minor importance of big communist Russia. Independence which seems so self-evident today depends at that moment on couple of random coincidences."

Cast
 Sergo Vares as Tanel Rõuk
 Liisi Koikson as Anna Rõuk
 Ain Lutsepp as Julius Saarepuu
 Piret Kalda as Maret Saarepuu
 Emil-Joosep Virkus as Joosep Saarepuu
 Tambet Tuisk as Specialist
 Mait Malmsten as lawyer Jaan (prototype: Jaan Anvelt)
 Taavi Teplenkov as Veidesoo
 Tiit Sukk as factory owner Indrek
 Rain Simmul as Head of Intelligence

Historic people
 Tõnu Kark as Major General Ernst Põdder
 Priit Pedajas as Major General Johan Unt
 Carmen Mikiver as Elsa Kingissepp
 Ilkka Koivula as Otto Kuusinen
 Yevgeni Knyazev as Grigori Zinovjev

Production
Actual conscripts from Tallinn's Guard Battalion were used to play the part of the mass-up soldiers.

Notes and references

External links
 
 

2008 films
2008 drama films
Estonian drama films